Iosif Klein (born 1902, date of death unknown) was a Romanian footballer who played as a striker.

International career
Iosif Klein played one friendly match for Romania, on 26 October 1923 under coach Constantin Rădulescu in a 2–2 against Turkey.

References

External links
 

1902 births
Year of death missing
Romanian footballers
Romania international footballers
Place of birth missing
Association football forwards
Liga I players